Gemma O'Connor (born 1940 in Dublin) is an Irish mystery writer.

Life
Born in Dublin in 1940, and educated in Ireland and France, she lived in Oxford, where she worked as a bookbinder, restaurateur and stewardess before becoming a writer.

In 1995 O'Connor had her first mystery story published, and as of 2019, she has had at least four more books published.

O'Connor and eighteen other female Irish writers contributed short stories for the 2005 collection, Irish Girls Are Back in Town.

Bibliography
Grace Hartfield
Sins of omission
Falls the shadow
Farewell to the Flesh (1998)
Juliet Furbo
Time to remember
Passage South
Walking on water
Following the Wake (2002)

References 

1940 births
Living people
Irish mystery writers
Irish women writers
Women mystery writers
Irish expatriates in France
Irish expatriates in the United Kingdom